The GfK Entertainment charts are record charts compiled by GfK Entertainment on behalf of the Bundesverband Musikindustrie (BVMI).

Achievements and milestones

Song milestones

Most weeks at number one

Most number-one singles

Most number-one singles in a calendar year

Songwriter and producer achievements

Most number-one singles

Most number-one singles in a calendar year

References